The Biskop Hvoslef is a veteran Norwegian sailing vessel. The vessel was named after  Bishop Waldemar Hvoslef (1825-1906).
Bjarne Aas designed the vessel which was his first rescue boat. The ship was built for the rescue company of Br. Fallfall in Hardanger and  put into service in 1933.  The ship was  utilized as a search and rescue by the Redningsselskapet (Norwegian Society for Rescue at Sea) on the Norwegian coast between 1933 and 1969. It is now a privately owned vessel.

References

External links 
website

Lifeboats
Ships of Norway
1933 ships
Ships built in Norway